Callideriphus is a genus of beetles in the family Cerambycidae, containing the following species:

 Callideriphus grossipes Blanchard in Gay, 1851
 Callideriphus tucumanus Napp & Martins, 2002

References

Heteropsini